Cedar Hill is an unincorporated community in northern Frederick County, Virginia, United States. Cedar Hill is located to northwest of Clear Brook off Cedar Hill Road along Browns Lane.

References

Unincorporated communities in Frederick County, Virginia
Unincorporated communities in Virginia